is a 9-volume Japanese manga written and illustrated by Yukie Nasu, revolving around the activities of four boys in Greenwood Dormitory at a fictional prestigious Japanese all-boys private school named Ryokuto Academy. The manga was serialized in Hana to Yume from 1987 to 1991 and published in English by Viz Media. It has been adapted into a six-episode anime OVA and a live-action television series.

Plot
After suffering from a series of mishaps, Kazuya Hasekawa has finally entered Ryokuto Academy. He is there to get away from his brother and his sister-in-law (whom Kazuya had a crush on). Unfortunately, he is assigned to live in the dorm known as Greenwood, a former insane asylum, where the weird students live. His roommate Shun Kisaragi looks just like a girl, and Kazuya initially thought he was until he saw Shun in the boys' bathroom. Also there are his next-door roommates, the dorm president Mitsuru Ikeda and his best friend, Shinobu Tezuka. The manga follows the everyday events and antics of Greenwood.

Characters

Main characters

 Kazuya was raised by his older brother, Kazuhiro, after the death of their parents when they were younger. Kazuya had applied to enter to Ryokuto Academy so he could be just like Kazuhiro. Kazuya had fallen in love with Sumire, his tutor and was heartbroken when she fell in love with Kazuhiro and subsequently married him. Kazuya had lost respect for his brother since then and moved into the dorm to get away from them. Unfortunately, Kazuya suffered injuries due to a car accident, an ulcer and other mishaps that had delayed him from entering the academy. Much to his dismay, he has to deal with the craziness in the Greenwood dorm and the fact that Kazuhiro is the school nurse. Eventually, he gets used to living in the dorm and is voted president of the dorm by Mitsuru. He later falls in love with a delinquent girl, Miya Igarashi, and dates her in the end of the manga and anime.
 Portrayed by Yuki Izawa in the Live action.

 Shun is Kazuya's easygoing roommate. Although Kisaragi resembles a cute, tomboyish girl, he's actually a guy. Shun is the oldest son of the Kisaragi family, who run a chain of traditional Japanese inns. The females in the Kisaragi family inherit the company, but it has no connection with Shun's girlish figure. Surprisingly, Shun is heterosexual and dated a girl in junior high. Shun is very self-confident and proud of his beautiful long hair, and he knows he is so cute. Because he thinks it is the best way to be cool, he does not hesitate to dress like a girl. He can makes sound decisions and is a man of action, and no character believes that Shun is actually feminine. Shun has a younger brother named Reina and an infant sister named Yui.
 Portrayed by Hiroki Suzuki in the Live Action.

 The President of Greenwood dormitory, and best friend of Shinobu Tezuka. The adopted son of the caretaker of the Ikeda temple in Tokyo, Mitsuru looks like Kazuya's brother in his younger days, and Mitsuru also seems to enjoy giving Kazuya a hard time. Mitsuru is roommates with Shinobu and lives next door to Kazuya and Shun, creating an interesting foursome. He also has an unusual ability: His face is able to heal any cut or bruise in under a minute. All that rough treatment on Kazuya, however, is merely his way of toughening up Kazuya so he can take Mitsuru's place as Residence Hall President. Also, he tries his best to stay away from his adopted family. Since he was a child, he knew he was adopted, and he knew he didn't really belong, so he tries to distance himself from his adopted family.
 Portrayed by Riki Miura in the Live Action.

 The smartest student living in Greenwood dormitory, and best friend of Mitsuru Ikeda. Unlike Mitsuru, Shinobu is calm and quiet and is unaffected by anything. His near perfect attitude and talent is what drives his cousin Nagisa full of jealousy.
 Portrayed by Yuuichi Sato in the live action.

Supporting characters

 Kazuya's older brother and the school nurse at Ryokuto Academy. He likes to tease Kazuya, but lovingly cares for him. He is married to Sumire.
Portrayed by: Kengo Ohkuchi

 Kazuhiro's wife and Kazuya's former crush, now sister-in-law. She cares for both brothers, and affectionately calls Kazuya "Ya-kun".
Portrayed by: Yukari Fukui

 A delinquent high school girl, she is the object of affection for Kazuya. She defies her mother's wishes to be with her childhood friend Tenma Koizumi in order to be with Kazuya. She is also friends with Mitsuru.
Portrayed by: Aoi Yoshikura

 Miya's childhood friend, who is Kazuya's rival for Miya's affection.

 Shinobu's older cousin, she is insanely jealous of Shinobu since childhood and wants to ruin his life. She once kidnapped Mitsuru and stripped him of his clothes in an attempt to get Shinobu to submit to her, but he managed to foil her plans. She tries again, but accidentally abducts Shun's younger brother, Reina. She has a group of henchman - simply called "A", "B", "C" and "D" - to help her with her plans.

 Shun's younger brother, who is cute and also looks like a girl. He is accidentally kidnapped by Nagisa's men while on his way to visit Shun in the dorm.

 A senior student at the dorm. He lives with his motorcycle and carries it around with him. He has a girlfriend named Yuko.
Portrayed by: Hiroshi Nagao

Media

Manga
The manga had run in Hakuensha's Hana to Yume shōjo magazine from 1987 to 1991. The manga was collected in eleven volumes. In North America, the manga was released in English by Viz Media in nine volumes.

Anime
A six-episode OVA series, produced by Pierrot was released between 1991 and 1993. The OVAs were initially licensed by Software Sculptors, who released the series on VHS and Laserdisc in 1996, with an English dub produced by TAJ Productions. The anime was then licensed to Media Blasters in 2004, who released the series on DVD featuring a new English dub by Bang Zoom! Entertainment.

Live action/drama
A thirteen episode live-action television drama was broadcast by Tokyo MX, between July 2, 2008 and September 24, 2008.

References

External links
Official website of the live-action series 
 

1987 manga
1991 anime OVAs
2008 Japanese television series debuts
2008 Japanese television series endings
Anime Works
Central Park Media
Hakusensha franchises
Hakusensha manga
Japanese drama television series
Pierrot (company)
Romance anime and manga
School life in anime and manga
Shōjo manga
Tokyo MX original programming
Viz Media manga